Salim Ali Bird Sanctuary is an estuarine mangrove habitat, which is declared as the bird sanctuary, and located on western tip of the Island of Chorão along the Mandovi River, Goa, in India. The sanctuary is named after Salim Ali, the eminent Indian ornithologist.

The sanctuary and island are accessed by a ferry service running between Ribander and Chorão. The sanctuary has a paved walk that runs between mangroves of Rhizophora mucronata, Avicennia officinalis and other species.

Description

The area is covered by low mangrove forest.

Flora and fauna

Several species of birds have been recorded and the common species include the striated heron and western reef heron. Other species that have been recorded include the little bittern, black bittern, red knot, jack snipe and pied avocet (on transient sandbanks). The sanctuary is also host to mudskippers, fiddler crabs and other mangrove habitat specialists. A species of crustacean Teleotanais indianis was described based on specimens obtained in the sanctuary.

Media

See also
 Salim Ali
 Bird sanctuaries of India

References

External links

 Goa Central
 Goa vacation guide
 GoaTourism

Chorão (Island)
Bird sanctuaries of Goa
Memorials to Salim Ali
Geography of North Goa district
1988 establishments in Goa
Protected areas established in 1988
Tourist attractions in North Goa district